This article lists the representative offices of Kurdistan Region, autonomous region of Iraq. The Kurdish presence abroad has grown significantly since 2007. The KRG currently has representative offices in 13 countries and a mission to the EU.  

Iraqi constitution guarantees the right of the Kurdistan Region to continue its practice of maintaining representative offices abroad in order to promote its economic, cultural and educational interests. Some countries are of particular importance to the KRG because of its longstanding relationship with them, because of their political and economic status, or because a significant portion of the Kurdish diaspora resides within their borders. The primary responsibilities of these representative offices are promoting international awareness and interest in regional politics, culture, economics, education, and business and investment opportunities. Additionally, given the large number of Iraqi Kurds living abroad, the KRG representative offices also assist with some legal services such as the ratification and authentication of documents belonging to members of Kurdish diaspora overseas, for use within the Kurdistan Region, in coordination with the Iraqi Ministry of Foreign Affairs. The KRG representative can also grant power of attorney and assist in helping people of the Kurdistan Region living abroad to obtain legal counsel in the Region.

Americas

 Washington, D.C. (Representative office)

Asia

 Tehran (Representative office)

Europe

 Vienna (Representative office)

 Paris (Representative office)

 Berlin (Representative office)

 Rome (Representative office)

 Kraków (Representative office)

 Moscow (Representative office)

 Madrid (Representative office)

 Stockholm (Representative office)

 Bern (Representative office)

 Ankara (Representative office, to open)

 London (Representative office)

Oceania

 Sydney (Representative office)

Multilateral organisations

 Brussels (Mission to the European Union)

See also
Foreign relations of Kurdistan Region
List of diplomatic missions in Kurdistan Region

References
General

Specific

Diplomatic missions
Diplomatic missions of Kurdistan Region
Kurdistan Region